Tostedt is a Samtgemeinde ("collective municipality") in the district of Harburg, in Lower Saxony, Germany. Its seat is in the village Tostedt.

Municipality structure 

The Samtgemeinde (SG) Tostedt consists of the following municipalities:

 Dohren 
 Handeloh 
 Heidenau
 Kakenstorf 
 Königsmoor 
 Otter 
 Tostedt
 Welle 
 Wistedt

Population development 
The inhabitants of the municipality Tostedt are distributed among the following member communities:

References

Samtgemeinden in Lower Saxony
Harburg (district)